Nanakvada is a census town in Valsad district in the Indian state of Gujarat.

Demographics
 India census, Nanakvada had a population of 8339. Males constitute 51% of the population and females 49%. Nanakvada has an average literacy rate of 84%, higher than the national average of 59.5%: male literacy is 87%, and female literacy is 80%. In Nanakvada, 9% of the population is under 6 years of age.

References

Cities and towns in Valsad district